Raymond Sabounghi (23 October 1931 – 20 December 2002) was an Egyptian basketball player. He competed in the men's tournament at the 1952 Summer Olympics.

References

External links
 

1931 births
2002 deaths
Egyptian men's basketball players
1959 FIBA World Championship players
Olympic basketball players of Egypt
Basketball players at the 1952 Summer Olympics
Place of birth missing